Gillsville is a city in Banks and Hall counties in the U.S. state of Georgia. The population was 235 at the 2010 census.

The Hall County portion of Gillsville is part of the Gainesville, GA Metropolitan Statistical Area.

History
The community was named after the local Gills family.

Geography
Gillsville is located at  (34.309090, -83.635621).

Demographics

2020 census

As of the 2020 United States census, there were 306 people, 90 households, and 68 families residing in the city.

2000 census
As of the census of 2000, there were 195 people, 79 households, and 57 families residing in the city. The racial makeup of the city was 99.49% White, and 0.51% from two or more races. Hispanic or Latino of any race were 1.54% of the population.

There were 79 households, out of which 30.4% had children under the age of 18 living with them, 67.1% were married couples living together, 5.1% had a female householder with no husband present, and 26.6% were non-families. 21.5% of all households were made up of individuals, and 15.2% had someone living alone who was 65 years of age or older.  The average household size was 2.47 and the average family size was 2.91.

In the city, the population was spread out, with 20.0% under the age of 18, 7.7% from 18 to 24, 27.2% from 25 to 44, 25.6% from 45 to 64, and 19.5% who were 65 years of age or older.  The median age was 42 years. For every 100 females, there were 93.1 males.  For every 100 females age 18 and over, there were 90.2 males.

The median income for a household in the city was $51,500, and the median income for a family was $62,750. Males had a median income of $35,417 versus $28,750 for females. The per capita income for the city was $27,551.  None of the families and 3.7% of the population were living below the poverty line, including no under eighteens and 7.5% of those over 64.

References 

Cities in Georgia (U.S. state)
Cities in Banks County, Georgia
Cities in Hall County, Georgia